Christopher Stewart Gray (April 24, 1950 – March 10, 2017) was an American journalist and architectural historian, noted for his weekly  column "Streetscapes" in The New York Times, about the history of New York City architecture, real estate and public improvements.

Career
Gray wrote the "Streetscapes" column from 1986 until December 2014. His work focuses on architecture, history and preservation policies of New York City.

He also wrote extensively about architecture for the magazines Avenue and House & Garden, and was the founder of the Office for Metropolitan History, an organization that provides research on the history of New York buildings. He wrote a column, "All the Best Places", from 1982 to 1985 on American streets for House & Garden.

Awards and honors
Gray received awards for his research and writing from the following:

 American Institute of Architects
 Classical America
 New York Genealogical and Biographical Society
 New York Landmarks Conservancy
 New York Society Library
 Preservation League of New York State

Books
 New York, Empire City (with David Stravitz; Harry N. Abrams, 2004) 
 New York Streetscapes (Harry N. Abrams, 2003 - Research by Suzanne Braley) 
 The Chrysler Building: Creating a New York Icon Day by Day (with David Stravitz; Princeton Architectural Press, 2002 - Research by Suzanne Braley) 
 Sutton Place, Uncommon Community by the River (Sutton Area Community, 1997) 
 Fifth Avenue, from Start to Finish, 1911, in Historic Block-by-Block Photographs (Dover, 1994 - Research by Suzanne Braley) 
 Changing New York (Dover Publications, 1992 - Research by Raymond Fike)  
 Blueprints (with John Boswell; Simon & Schuster, 1981)

See also

 List of American historians
 List of American print journalists
 List of The New York Times employees
 List of people from New York City

References

External links
 

1950 births
2017 deaths
20th-century births
20th-century American newspaper people
20th-century American non-fiction writers

21st-century American non-fiction writers
American architectural historians
American founders
American magazine journalists
American male journalists
Journalists from New York City
The New York Times columnists
Writers from New York City
20th-century American male writers
20th-century American journalists
21st-century American male writers
Historians from New York (state)